Lahad is a name which is used as a surname and a masculine given name. Notable people with the name are as follows:

Surname
 Antoine Lahad (1927–2015), Lebanese army general 
 Mooli Lahad (born 1953), Israeli psychologist

Given name
 Lahad Khater (1881–1975), Lebanese historian and writer

Arabic masculine given names
Hebrew-language surnames
Arabic-language surnames